Kabalai (Kaba Lai) is Afro-Asiatic language spoken in southwest Chad.

References

External links 
 Kabalai word list

East Chadic languages
Languages of Chad